Dead & Company Fall Fun Run 2019 was a concert tour by the rock band Dead & Company. It followed the band's Summer Tour 2019. The tour comprised ten dates across five locations from October 31 to December 31, 2019.

First the band played six shows on the East Coast at the end of October and the beginning of November.  Then they played four shows in California at the end of December.

Tour dates

Musicians
Bob Weir – guitar, vocals
Mickey Hart – drums
Bill Kreutzmann – drums
John Mayer – guitar, vocals
Oteil Burbridge – bass, percussion, vocals
Jeff Chimenti – keyboards, vocals

See also
 Reunions of the Grateful Dead

References

External links
Dead & Company official website

2019 concert tours
Dead & Company concert tours